is the 16th major single by the Japanese idol group Cute, released on May 25, 2011 on the Zetima label.

Background 
The single was intended as a summer tune. It was released in three versions: Regular Edition (catalog number EPCE-5790), and Limited Editions A (EPCE-5786) and B (EPCE-5788) that included a bonus DVD. Limited Edition A DVD contained the "Momoiro Sparkling (Dance Shot Ver.)" music video, and Limited Edition B had "Momoiro Sparkling (Close-up Ver.)". The Single V appeared on June 1.

Track listing

CD single

Single V

Charts

Sales and certifications

References

External links 
 
 

2011 singles
Japanese-language songs
Cute (Japanese idol group) songs
Songs written by Tsunku
Song recordings produced by Tsunku
Zetima Records singles
2011 songs